Primeo Energie or EBM (Cooperative Elektra Birseck, Münchenstein) is a Swiss energy supplier with head office in Münchenstein. It was founded as a cooperative under private law in 1897. EBM supplies around 230,000 people with electricity in North-West Switzerland and Alsace. The company operates 167 local heat supply systems in Switzerland, Alsace and South Germany.

History
The engineer Fritz Eckinger and politician Stephan Gschwind founded Elektra Birseck Münchenstein in 1897 with the intention of introducing electric lighting and the idea of organising a company as a cooperative, which was a new concept at the time. The supply area in the lower part of the Canton of Basel-Country and Birseck-Dorneck, a part of the Canton of Solothurn, was soon expanded. Between 1906 and 1914, EBM connected eleven municipalities and the City of Saint-Louis (Haut Rhin) to the grid. Since 1921, EBM has been supplying a total of 60 municipalities with electricity in the Swiss Cantons of Basel-Landschaft and Solothurn.

In 1979, it became the first company in Switzerland to support the frugal and rational use of energy. EBM implemented the first tariffs for promoting renewable energies and set up an energy and environmental advice centre for its customers. In the field of decentralised heating supplies, EBM developed the concepts «cogeneration plant and heat pump» at the beginning of the 1980s and constructed the first cogeneration plant in 1982.

Since 1992, the company constructs, supports and participates in photovoltaic plants, to supply solar energy at a favourable price. In 1997, EBM opened an electricity museum in Münchenstein to celebrate its 100th anniversary.

In 2009, EBM started producing electricity from wind and solar power. The company founded aravis («Aravis Energy I LP») to realise large plants in Southern Europe. It is the first «Swiss Limited Partnership» (limited commercial partnership for collective capital investments) that was approved by the Swiss Federal Banking Commission. The fund was used for developing projects with a volume of CHF 200 million. EBM was the main investor with CHF 70 million. EBM’s investments helped to realise wind parks and photovoltaic plants in Italy and Spain with an installed output of around 64 Megawatt.

Renewable energy
EBM procures electricity from renewable energies from its own plants, partner plants and long-term agreements. In addition to plants in the region, specific plans are in place to realise large projects in suitable foreign locations.

EBM aims to expand in Europe and Switzerland in the medium terms with the help of the companies «EBM Greenpower AG», «Leading Swiss renewables AG» and its minority share in «Kleinkraftwerk Birseck AG». The electricity generated by foreign plants is not yet supplied to Switzerland but is sold directly abroad at local supply prices or on the foreign electricity markets. The electricity generated from renewable energies rose to 811,703 MWh (as of 31 December 2013) as a result of EBM increasing the number of its plants.

LSR investment company
«Leading Swiss renewables AG» (LSR) is an investment company founded by EBM, «Energie Wasser Bern» and «Aravis» in January 2012. The company’s purpose is to develop renewable energy production plants in Europe in the medium term. It has around EUR 100 million in capital at its disposal to meet this target. EBM holds a share of EUR 65 million and «Energie Wasser Bern» a share of EUR 35 million. Plans are for the total installed output to exceed 100 Megawatt in an initial phase. The focus is on wind energy as there is an active market for wind power projects in numerous European countries.

Kleinkraftwerk Birseck AG (KKB)
Decentralised power plants have been gaining in importance in recent years as it has become increasingly difficult to construct large power plants in Switzerland and the rest of Europe. EBM has invested in KKB AG, an independent producer of electricity generated from renewable energies. The company acquires and operates water, solar and wind power plants in Switzerland and certain European countries. KKB AG is listed at the stock exchange in Bern under securities number ISIN CH0023777235 listed.

Heat production and renewable energy
For more than 30 years, EBM Wärme AG has been operating in the field of heat contracting throughout Switzerland. Its focus has been on the use of renewable energies for many years. In the beginning, EBM mainly realised heating networks in its Swiss grid area. Today, the company is represented in almost all of Switzerland, in the adjoining Alsace by «EBM Thermique SAS» and even in Baden-Wuerttemberg, Germany, by «EBM Wärme GmbH». In 2012, EBM operated a total of 170 plants.

Company structure
EBM is a cooperative under private law. The cooperative members include legal entities and private persons owning property that is connected to EBM’s grid. The company had over 50,000 cooperative members in 2013.

References

External links
EBM Switzerland
EBM France

Energy companies of Switzerland
Energy cooperatives
Consumers' cooperatives in Switzerland
Swiss companies established in 1897
Energy companies established in 1897
District heating